The Tornado Outbreak of April 23, 2000, also known as the 2000 Easter Sunday Tornado Outbreak, occurred in the states of Oklahoma, Texas, Arkansas, and Louisiana on Easter Sunday, April 23, 2000. This severe weather occurrence was the result of a cold front moving through the area from North Texas and consisted of at least six supercell thunderstorms. A total of 33 tornadoes touched down within seven hours on April 23, 2000. No fatalities were reported, but at least 12 individuals were injured.

Confirmed tornadoes

April 23 Event

See also
List of North American tornadoes and tornado outbreaks
2020 Easter tornado outbreak

References

A
A
A
A
A
A
April
April 2000 events in the United States